A Nippon individual savings account (NISA) is an account that is meant to help residents in Japan save money with tax-exempt benefits. It is modeled after the Individual Savings Account in the United Kingdom.

History

NISA was created in 2014 as a way to encourage more people to save for retirement with investments. This was mainly spurred by the studies showing that the majority of Japanese residents had little to no savings for retirement and most of that savings being cash rather than investments.

Features
The account earns tax-free growth up until five years and resets every cycle.  Each account is only allowed to invest ￥1,200,000 each year with a total maximum limit of ￥6,000,000 after which anything contributed and any capital gains over the limit is fully taxed. Unlike other retirement tax-deferred accounts, a NISA is only allowed to hold stocks, ETFs, and trusts. Bonds are not permitted in the accounts. This account is meant to be a mid-term investment option for those who don't have iDeCo.

Reserve積立NISA
A new type of NISA account that was introduced in 2018 that has a 20-year tax-exempt with a yearly contribution limit of ￥400,000. Unlike the regular NISA account, this one only allows mutual funds for investments.

Junior NISA
Introduced in 2016, a Junior NISA is modeled after the Junior ISA in the United Kingdom and is meant to help parents and guardians save money for anyone under 20. A Junior NISA has a yearly limit of ￥800,000.

See also
Non-pension products:
 Individual Savings Account (ISA), the original account in the UK that NISA is modeled after.
 Tax-free savings account (TFSA) (Canada)
 Livret A (France)
Pensions:
 Superannuation in Australia
 Individual retirement account (IRA); the Roth IRA type is similar except for having extra restrictions (United States)
 401(k); the Roth 401(k) type is similar (United States)

References

Investment in Japan
Tax-advantaged savings plans